Nikolai Borisovich Kolesov (born February 16, 1956; died August 23, 1998) was a Russian professional footballer.

Club career
He made his professional debut in the Soviet Top League in 1976 for FC Dynamo Moscow.

European club competitions
With FC Dynamo Moscow.

 European Cup Winners' Cup 1977–78: 4 games, 3 goals (hat-trick against Valletta F.C.).
 European Cup Winners' Cup 1979–80: 3 games, 1 goal.
 UEFA Cup 1980–81: 1 game.

References

1956 births
Footballers from Moscow
1998 deaths
Soviet footballers
Russian footballers
Association football midfielders
FC Dynamo Moscow players
FC Kuban Krasnodar players
FC Vorskla Poltava players
FC KAMAZ Naberezhnye Chelny players
CSF Bălți players
FC Arsenal Tula players
Soviet Top League players
Russian Premier League players